Kirill Viktorovich Panchenko (born 16 October 1989) is a Russian footballer who plays as a second striker for FC Arsenal Tula.

Career
On 25 June 2013, Panchenko signed with Tom Tomsk. A year later, in July 2014, Panchenko signed for reigning Russian Premier League champions PFC CSKA Moscow on a five-year contract. Upon signing for CSKA, Panchenko played in the shirt number 11 until Steven Zuber left the club, then he took number 8.

On 16 June 2016, he was loaned to FC Dynamo Moscow for the 2016–17 season. On 23 February 2017, Dynamo announced they have agreed on terms with Panchenko and will activate the buy-out clause to gain his full rights after the loan deal expires at the end of the season. CSKA confirmed the permanent transfer on 23 May 2017.

On 6 August 2020, he signed with Tambov for the term of 3 years, with an option to terminate the contract early in case of Tambov's relegation from the Russian Premier League.

On 11 October 2020 he moved to FC Arsenal Tula on a two-year contract.

Personal life
His father Viktor Panchenko was also a professional footballer, and was the top scorer during the 1993 Russian Premier League season.

He is married to Yana, with whom he has a daughter named Kristina.

International
In October 2016, he was called up to the national team for a friendly against Costa Rica. He made his debut for the squad on 10 November 2016 in a friendly game against Qatar.

Honours
Individual
Russian National Football League top scorer: 2016–17 (24 goals for FC Dynamo Moscow)

Club statistics

Club

References

External links
 
 Player profile at CSKA Moscow official website
 

1989 births
Sportspeople from Lipetsk
Living people
Russian people of Ukrainian descent
Russian footballers
Russia national football B team footballers
Russia international footballers
Association football forwards
FC Dynamo Stavropol players
FC Nizhny Novgorod (2007) players
FC Mordovia Saransk players
FC Tom Tomsk players
PFC CSKA Moscow players
FC Dynamo Moscow players
FC Tambov players
FC Arsenal Tula players
Russian Premier League players
Russian First League players
Russian Second League players